Raymond John Muro also known as Bobby Trendy, is an American interior decorator, fashion designer and television personality best known for his appearance on The Anna Nicole Show.

Muro grew up in Northern California. At the age of 17 he moved to Beverly Hills, California using his own savings.

Anna Nicole Smith hired Trendy to decorate her new house on her television show The Anna Nicole Show. About how he got on the show, Trendy has said "listen, and listen good. They saw me on E!'s Celebrity Homes, and they knew that I was deep".

References

External links

 
 

Living people
American male film actors
American male television actors
American gay actors
Participants in American reality television series
American artists of Vietnamese descent
American people of Vietnamese descent
Place of birth missing (living people)
American LGBT people of Asian descent
Year of birth missing (living people)
21st-century American LGBT people